Diphenylmercury is the organomercury compound with the formula Hg(C6H5)2. It is a white solid. The compound is of historic interest as a particularly stable organometallic compound but it finds few uses because of its high toxicity.

Preparation
Commercially available, this compound can be prepared by several routes. It results from treating phenylmercury acetate with sodium stannite, by the reaction of mercuric halides with phenylmagnesium bromide, and the reaction of bromobenzene with sodium amalgam.

Safety
Diphenylmercury is highly toxic.

References

Organomercury compounds
Phenyl compounds